This is a list of Albanian musicians.

Male singers

A 
 Dren Abazi (born 1985)
 Vedat Ademi (born 1982)
 Kristaq Antoniu (1907–1979)
 Xhoni Athanas (1925-2019)
 Azet (born 1993)

B 
 Bardhi (born 1997)
 Laver Bariu (1929–2014)
 Lindon Berisha (born 1990)
 Sin Boy (born 1994)
 Action Bronson (born 1983)
 Ardian Bujupi (born 1991)
 Eugent Bushpepa (born 1984)
 Buta (born 1995)

C 
 Capital T (born 1992)
 Claydee (born 1985)

Ç 
 Gaqo Çako (1935-2018)
 Pirro Çako (born 1965)

D 
 Limoz Dizdari (born 1942)
 Shkëlzen Doli (born 1971)
 David Dreshaj (born 1999)
 Pjetër Dungu (1908–1989)

E 
 Luiz Ejlli (born 1985)
 Elai (born 1999)

F 
 Ermal Fejzullahu (born 1988)
 Fero (born 1997)
 Fifi (born 1994)
 Florat (born 1997)
 Dr. Flori (1979–2014)

G 
 Adrian Gaxha (born 1984)
 Tahir Gjoci (born 1993)
 GASHI (born 1989)

Gj 
 Gjon's Tears (born 1998)
 Ardit Gjebrea (born 1963)
 Tiri Gjoci (born 1993)
 Ingrid Gjoni (born 1981)
 Rosela Gjylbegu (born 1987)

H 
 Anxhelina Hadërgjonaj (born 1992)
 Agim Hushi (born 1967)

I 
 Yon Idy
 Butrint Imeri (born 1996)
 Era Istrefi (born 1994)

J 
 Prenkë Jakova (1917–1969)

K 
 Shpat Kasapi (born 1985)
 Kidda (born 1997)
 Killua
 Ramiz Kovaçi (1929-1994)
 Agim Krajka (1937-2021)
 MC Kresha (born 1984)

L 
 Yll Limani (born 1994)
 Adrian Lulgjuraj (born 1980)

M 
 Majk (born 1990)
 Ermal Mamaqi (born 1982)
 Ermal Meta (born 1981)
 Mozzik (born 1995)
 Neço Muko (1899-1934)
 Avni Mula (1928-2020)
 Flori Mumajesi (born 1982)

N 
 Frederik Ndoci (born 1960)
 Noizy (born 1986)
 Nikollë Nikprelaj (born 1961)

P 
 Kristaq Paspali (1928–2001)
 Aleksandër Peçi (born 1951)
 Ismet Peja (1937-2020)
 Salih Uglla Peshteri (1849-1945)
 Enver Petrovci (born 1954)
 Saimir Pirgu (born 1981)

Q 
 Muharrem Qena (1930-2006)

R 
 Alban Ramosaj (born 1996)

S 
 Bledar Sejko (born 1971)
 Getoar Selimi (born 1982)
 Alban Skënderaj (born 1982)
 Lyrical Son (born 1984)
 Albert Stanaj (born 1994)

T 
 Toquel (born 1994)
 David Tukiçi (born 1956)
 Ibrahim Tukiqi (1926–2004)

U 
 Unikkatil (born 1981)

V 
 Vinz (born 1992)
 Demir Vlonjati (1780–1845)
 Ledri Vula (born 1986)

X 
 Mentor Xhemali (1926-1992)
 Don Xhoni (born 2000)

Z 
 Young Zerka (born 1992)
 Kastro Zizo (born 1984)
 Nikolla Zoraqi (1928-1991)

Female singers

A 
 Arilena Ara (born 1998)
 Melinda Ademi (born 1995)

B 
 Arta Bajrami (born 1980)
 Rina Balaj (born 1999)
 Aida Baraku (born 1967)
 Besa (born 1989)
 Anita Bitri (1968–2004)
 Bleona (born 1979)
 Olta Boka (born 1991)

C 
 Miriam Cani (born 1985)

Ç 
 Çiljeta (born 1965)
 Ledina Çelo (born 1977)
 Isea Çili (born 2007)
 Çiljeta (born 1985)

D 
 Elhaida Dani (born 1993)
 Ergi Dini (1994-2016)
 Dhurata Dora (born 1992)
 Afërdita Dreshaj (born 1986)
 Elina Duni (born 1981)

E 
 Enca (born 1995)
 Kristine Elezaj (born 1986)
 Elia, Princess of Albania (born 1983)
 Emmy (1989-2011)

F 
 Fifi (born 1994)
 Eli Fara (born 1967)
 Eleni Foureira (born 1987)

G 
 Aurela Gaçe (born 1974)
 Ana Golja (born 1996)
 Flaka Goranci (born 1985)

Gj 
 Elvana Gjata (born 1987)
 Ingrid Gjoni (born 1981)
 Rosela Gjylbegu (born 1987)

H 
 Anxhelina Hadërgjonaj (born 1993)
 Ronela Hajati (born 1989)
 Lindita Halimi (born 1989)
 Enca Haxhia (born 1995)
 Alida Hisku (born 1957)

I 
 Ilira (born 1994)
 Adelina Ismajli (born 1979)
 Genta Ismajli (born 1984)
 Era Istrefi (born 1994)
 Nora Istrefi (born 1986)

J 
 Leonora Jakupi (born 1979)
 Ermonela Jaho (born 1974)

K 
 Kanita (born 2001)
 Samanta Karavello (born 1990)
 Albina Kelmendi (born 1998)
 Kida (born 1997)
 Eni Koçi (born 1996)
 Tefta Tashko-Koço (1910-1947)
 Liljana Kondakçi (born 1950)
 Flaka Krelani (born 1988)
 Marie Kraja (1911–1999)
 Yllka Kuqi (born 1982)

L 
 Irma Libohova (born 1959)
 Elsa Lila (born 1981)
 Lindita (born 1989)
 Dua Lipa (born 1995)
 Marie Logoreci (1920-1988)
 Vesa Luma (born 1986)
 Venera Lumani (born 1991)

M 
 Soni Malaj (born 1981)
 Jonida Maliqi (born 1983)
 Oriola Marashi (born 1996)
 Hersi Matmuja (born 1991)
 Ava Max (born 1994)
 Luçie Miloti (1930–2006)
 Inva Mula (born 1963)
 Xhensila Myrtezaj (born 1993)

N 
 Laura Nezha (born 1990)
 Inis Neziri (born 2001)
 Pavlina Nikaj (1931–2011)
 Rona Nishliu (born 1986)

O 
 Rita Ora (born 1990)
 Anna Oxa (born 1961)

P 
 Nexhmije Pagarusha (1933-2020)
 Juliana Pasha (born 1980)
 Anxhela Peristeri (born 1986)

Q 
 Bleona Qereti (born 1979)

R 
 Rozana Radi (born 1979)
 Bebe Rexha (born 1989)
 Fitnete Rexha (1933–2003)

S 
 Parashqevi Simaku (born 1966)
 Rezarta Smaja (born 1984)
 Fatime Sokoli (1948–1987)
 Rovena Stefa (born 1979)
 Kanita Suma (born 2001)

Sh 
 Anjeza Shahini (born 1987)

T 
 Eneda Tarifa (born 1982)
 Tefta Tashko (1910–1947)
 Tayna (born 1996)
 Kejsi Tola (born 1992)
 Mirjam Tola (born 1972)
 Tuna (born 1985)
 Jorgjia Filçe-Truja (1907–1994)

Th 
 Adelina Thaçi (born 1980)

V 
 Alketa Vejsiu (born 1984)
 Luana Vjollca (born 1991)

Z 
 Vaçe Zela (1939–2014)
 Dafina Zeqiri (born 1989)

Musical groups 

 Alban Skenderaj
 Adrian Lulgjuraj
 Blla Blla Blla
 Elita 5
Eugent Bushpepa
Flaka Krelani
Gjurmët
Rona Nishliu
Sunrise
Syndrom
SYTË
Troja
Venera Lumani

References 

Musicians
Alba